Fisherman's Bait: A Bass Challenge, also known as simply Fisherman's Bait and in Japan as , is a fishing video game developed and published by Konami for the arcades in 1998. It was later ported to the PlayStation in 1999.

Reception

The PlayStation version received mixed reviews according to the review aggregation website GameRankings. In Japan, Famitsu gave it a score of 26 out of 40.

Notes

References

External links
 
 

1998 video games
Arcade video games
Fishing video games
Konami games
PlayStation (console) games
Video games developed in Japan